Hryhoriy Mykhailovych Pedchenko (born January 3, 1955) is a Ukrainian military officer who served as the Chief of General Staff and the Chief Commander of the Armed Forces of Ukraine.

References

1955 births
Living people
People from Kyiv Oblast
Colonel Generals of Ukraine
Chiefs of the General Staff (Ukraine)
Party of Regions politicians
Frunze Military Academy alumni